Akron Airport  is a privately owned, public airport in Erie County, New York, a mile east of Akron, a village in the Town of Newstead.

Facilities and aircraft 
Runway 7/25 is asphalt, 3,270 by 75 feet (997 by 23 m). Runway 11/29 has a turf surface 1,955 by 50 feet (596 by 15 m).

In the year ended September 11, 2009 the airport had 50,900 aircraft operations, an average of 139 per day: 98% general aviation and 2% air taxi. 54 aircraft were then based at this airport: 98% single-engine and 2% multi-engine.

Nearby airports 
Nearby airports with instrument approach procedures include:
 0G0 – North Buffalo Suburban Airport (11 nm NW)
 BUF – Buffalo Niagara International Airport (12 nm SW)
 9G6 – Pine Hill Airport (13 nm NE)
 GVQ – Genesee County Airport (14 nm E)
 9G0 – Buffalo Airfield (14 nm SW)

References

External links 
 Akron Airport (9G3) at NYSDOT Airport Directory
 Aerial image as of March 1995 from USGS The National Map
 
 

Airports in New York (state)
Transportation buildings and structures in Erie County, New York